Black River is an unincorporated Dispersed Rural Community in the municipality of South Stormont, United Counties of Stormont, Dundas and Glengarry in eastern Ontario, Canada.

See also
 Black River-Matheson, Ontario, a township municipality in Cochrane District

References

Other map sources:

Communities in the United Counties of Stormont, Dundas and Glengarry